Gaonkar is a surname. Notable people with the surname include:

Dilip P. Gaonkar (born 1945), American academic and writer
Gopal Gaonkar (born 1938), American academic
Harish Gaonkar (born 1946), Indian lepidopterist
Mala Gaonkar, American businesswoman
Meghana Gaonkar, Indian actress
Sannappa Parameshwar Gaonkar (1885–1972), Indian politician and writer